Greta Alexandra Grönholm (8 June 1923 – 12 June 2015) was a Finnish sprint canoer who competed in the early 1950s. She won a gold medal in the K-2 500 m event at the 1950 ICF Canoe Sprint World Championships in Copenhagen. Grönholm was born in Ekenäs in June 1923 and died in June 2015 at the age of 92.

References

1923 births
2015 deaths
Finnish female canoeists
ICF Canoe Sprint World Championships medalists in kayak
People from Raseborg
Sportspeople from Uusimaa